The La De Da's were a New Zealand rock band of the 1960s and early 1970s. Formed in New Zealand in 1963 as the Mergers, they had considerable success in both New Zealand and Australia until their split in 1975.

In Australia the band is probably best known as the launching place for the solo career of guitarist Kevin Borich, and for their recording of the first Australasian rock concept album, The Happy Prince, in 1969.

1963–66

The band which eventually became the La De Da's was started by three young musicians from the rural Huapai district, near Auckland in the North Island of New Zealand. Friends Kevin Borich, Brett Neilson and Trevor Wilson were all from Rutherford High School in Te Atatū Peninsula. The Mergers formed in late 1963 as a Shadows-style instrumental group and began playing local dances and school socials, but the Beatles' visit in June 1964, and the emergence of the Rolling Stones, crystallised the need for change of style and a lead singer. Trevor Wilson suggested a friend from nearby Mt Albert Grammar School, Phil Key, who joined as vocalist and rhythm guitarist.

The group decided that "The Mergers" failed to reflect the toughness of their music, so began searching for another name. One promoter even changed their name to "The Gonks" for an early 1965 gig at a summer carnival. They decided on "The Criminals", but Key's mother was not impressed and after rehearsals one night at the Wilson house, she jokingly suggested instead that they call themselves "something nice, like the la-de-das ...". Key loved it and the name stuck.

By early 1965 their weekend hobby had taken off and they were getting regular bookings on Auckland's booming dance circuit. Their first recordings were made in an Auckland two-track studio. They cut two tracks written by Borich, "Ever Since That Night" and "Little Girl" (co-written with Trevor Wilson). The single was released on the Talent City label in April 1965, but only sold to friends, family and fans.

In November 1965 they had a major break when they were called up to fill in at The Platterack. The La De Da's went over well and were offered further bookings at the club. After Phil Key finished school in December, the band turned professional. The Platterack took on the Las De Das as the resident band, replacing the Dallas Four. The band received £12 per week and were soon packing out the club on a regular basis. It was here they linked up with one of the regular patrons, Bruce Howard, a classically trained keyboard player. Bruce auditioned at the next rehearsal and joined the band. He and Trevor Wilson became the creative core of the band, writing all their original material.

In January 1966, Stebbing was given an import copy of a Changin' Times album by Philips A&R man John McCready and he immediately tagged the track "How Is The Air Up There?" as a possible song for a local band. The La De Da's performed a demo, resulting in them cutting a recording and signing to Zodiac for both management and production, with their recordings distributed through Phillips. They recorded a series of hits through 1966–67, which are now regarded as classics of '60s R&B.

Their third single, a John Mayall song called "On Top of the World", eventually peaked at No. 2. Stebbing then offered them residency at his Galaxie nightclub and they were regulars on the C'mon TV show. As indicated by the choice of B-side, the band were now well and truly into their Mod phase, setting Auckland trends with plaid trousers, satin shirts and buckle shoes. The bands situation is described by Phil Key:
The hits just inspired confidence in us. We became totally involved in getting dressed up and going out to gigs, the gigs and rehearsals were everything. Nothing worried us, we were so busy consuming what was happening around us. We were super aware, on top of every trend in music and clothes and language. We tried to be honest and sincere with our music, only playing and recording what we liked. The guys in the good record bars dug what we were doing and they got in all the latest English R&B records for us. We were listening to Zoot Money, John Mayall, Manfred Mann, The Animals, all that sort of stuff and trying to create that sound. We were different from groups like The Underdogs who just played 12-bar blues all night; we tried to be a lot more imaginative about what we did ... We had no idea what we were earning on tour, we just spent what we wanted and ploughed the rest back into the band. We had our way with girls, bought more clothes and equipment and just enjoyed being stars.

In November '66 "How Is The Air Up There?" reached the finals of the Loxene Golden Disc and recorded their debut album of covers, which was released in time for Christmas 1966, it immediately sold out of its first pressing.

Keyboard player Claude Papesch introduced them to Bruce Channel's "Hey Baby" and predicted it would be a surefire hit for them. They cut it immediately, released it as their next single in February, and resulted in their first #1 hit in March 1967.

In April they released their classic Stupidity EP. Like their debut album, the songs were all proven stage favourites: "Stupidity", "Coming Home", the Young Rascals’ "I Ain't Gonna Eat Out My Heart Anymore" and Otis Redding's "Respect". Aficionados now regard it as one of the best of New Zealand R&B records of the 1960s.

While preparing for their second album, Trevor Wilson started developing what would later be called "rock opera". For the basis of the piece he chose to adapt Oscar Wilde's classic tale "The Happy Prince". At this point, Bruce Howard was his only ally in the band, but together they started to piece the work together. This was the seed of later divisions within the band.

The second LP, Find Us A Way showed the band moving away from their R&B roots and taking in new influences from acts like The Spencer Davis Group, who were themselves starting to move away from their earlier style. This album contained some original compositions as well as stage favourites. Although they were apparently unhappy about not being not consulted over the final track selection or the cover art, it also sold very well.

1967–69
May 1967 was The La De Da's' first trip to Australia. The trip included a week-long engagement at Ward Austin's Jungle disco, followed by a support slot on the shows at the Sydney Stadium by The Easybeats, who had just returned from the UK. The band were told to clean up their image, so they had their near-shoulder-length hair trimmed back. In following publicity, the band were pitched at the teenage market, a ploy which did not sit comfortably with them.

"All Purpose Low"/"My Girl", was released in June and went to #3 on the NZ charts, followed in August by "Rosalie"/"Find Us A Way" which reached #5.

On the eve of their second visit to Australia, drummer Brett Neilson left the group. He was replaced by Bryan Harris, drummer with The Action. In February 1968, The La De Da's made their second trip to Australia, gaining a reputation for uncompromising and flamboyant live shows on the Sydney circuit. Now dubbed "The Beautiful La De Da's" they were at the forefront of Australian psychedelia. In June, Bryan Harris left and he was replaced by Keith Barber, from The Wild Cherries. In August, they made their second trip to Melbourne and they packed out venues around the city. The direct result was their winning the vote as "Best Australian Disco Act" in the 1968 Go-Set Pop Poll in December.

Jimmy Stewart, an expatriate English producer, had recently set up a new independent label, Sweet Peach. Stewart approached the La De Da's with an offer to record and release The Happy Prince in late 1968. The band began intensive rehearsals in preparation for recording at Bill Armstrong's Melbourne studio. But by November the label had pulled out and the deal collapsed. It was at this point that Melbourne identity Adrian Rawlins came to their rescue. At a gig at the Here Disco in North Sydney; he exhorted the band not to give up on the project and his enthusiasm convinced Trevor Wilson to give it one more try. Gathering support from Widmer and Cordon Bleu, Barry Kimberly of publishers Essex Music and the EMI label, Rawlins and Widmer managed to stitch together a deal to record the album.

Overseen by David Woodley-Page, The Happy Prince was recorded over four weeks in early 1969. The process of "bouncing down" — dubbing a completed 4-track recording onto one track of another tape was susceptible to the buildup of noise on the master tape. However, The Happy Prince effectively became Australia's first 8-track recording, achieved by recording onto on two Scully half-inch, 4-track recorders that were electronically synchronised. This de facto 8-track method provided much greater scope for multitracking and overdubbing and a considerable improvement in overall sound quality. The band released The Happy Prince in April 1969. Hailed as the first Australian concept album, the ambitious LP was a suite of songs co-written by Howard and Wilson. Rave reviews from critics failed to transfer into sales, and the band came close to splitting after its release.

Their next tour was to England. Their Traffic covers carried little weight on Traffic's home turf, so they abandoned touring to record new material. They performed a few well-received shows at London's Stax Club, the Corn Exchange and at clubs in Birmingham, but the gigs soon dried up. They left England to perform a month of poorly paid gigs in France.

Leaving Wilson in the UK, the rest of the group returned to Australia. On their return, they found out that there was far less work on offer than they had been led to believe, but they took what was available and continued gigging to pay back the airfares. Reno Tahei (ex-Sounds Unlimited, Compulsion, Castaways, Luke's Walnut, Genesis) filled in on drums for a few months until Wilson returned. Tahei was arrested and was deported back to New Zealand.

The sudden exit of Tahei, Howard and Wilson regrouped as a four-piece. Peter Roberts from Freshwater joined on bass. At Byron Bay on New Year's Eve 1970, the La De Da's unveiled their new 4-piece's stripped-down hard rock style, which took them back to their R&B roots and drew heavily from 12-bar Chicago blues and the legacy of Jimi Hendrix. The new lineup got a rousing reception at the Wallacia Festival in January. They regularly shared bills with the leading groups of the day -- Tamam Shud, Company Caine, Chain and the similarly revitalised Billy Thorpe & The Aztecs.

In the latter half of the year, they often appeared alongside new sensations Daddy Cool and the press made much of the supposed rivalry between the two bands. In September they teamed with Chain, Tamam Shud and Country Radio for two outdoor concerts at Wollongong and Sydney Showgrounds, before a combined crowd of about 10,000 people, and on Boxing Day 1971 they co-headlined with Daddy Cool before an estimated 50,000 people at the 3XY Rosebud Show in Victoria, cementing their position as one of the top three bands in the country, beside The Aztecs and Daddy Cool.

Towards the end of the year, the La De Da's recorded their fourth single. When released in November, "Gonna See My Baby Tonight" drew a rave review from Molly Meldrum in Go-Set ("...a fantastic song, intelligently recorded, it has to be number one.") and it raced up the charts, reaching #6.

1971–72
In November 1971, the La De Da's were scheduled to go to New Zealand for a four-week return tour. Although the shows sold out well in advance, the group dropped out at the last minute. In January 1972 they performed at the inaugural Sunbury Pop Festival, and they proved to be one of the highlights of the weekend. "Roundabout", "Gonna See My Baby Tonight" and the yet-to-be-released "Morning Good Morning" were included on EMI's Sunbury double album live set, released in October '72.

Michael Chugg of Consolidated Rock was hired as their full-time agent, and the group was soon netting regular fees of $300–400 per show. Chugg later left Con Rock and set up his own agency, Sunrise, which continued to handle The La De Da's.

They continued to draw huge crowds through 1972, touring nationally supporting Manfred Mann's Chapter III, and making a record-breaking appearance with Gerry Humphries, Friends and Billy Thorpe & The Aztecs at 3XY's free concert at the Myer Music Bowl, which drew over 200,000 people – the largest concert audience ever in Australia at that time.

In spite of the successes, internal tension in the band had been growing. Phil Key and Peter Roberts abruptly left the group in September 1972 to form a new four piece outfit called Band of Light. Michael Chugg had resigned as their manager a month before the split, and they were now managed by Roger Davies. Kevin Borich, now the only remaining original member, brought in Ronnie Peel to continue the band. He retained Keith Barber and decided to carry on as a power trio. Their debut performance as a trio was at Sydney's Paddington Town Hall in November.

1973–75

In January, the new La De Da's lineup headlined the Great Ngaruawahia Festival back in New Zealand. According to John Dix, the La De Da's delivered "...a well-paced set [that] blew Black Sabbath and everything New Zealand had to offer clear off the stage." Following this, they completed a short major-city concert tour in May. For the rest of the year, it was a constant round of touring, either as headliners, or sharing the bill with Sherbet, or as support to visiting international acts such as Little Richard, Gary Glitter, Three Dog Night, The Guess Who and Lindisfarne. They also provided backing on two tracks for Richard Clapton's debut album Prussian Blue.

On 8 July, on the way to a Lindisfarne gig, their truck was involved in a head-on collision on the Hume Highway between Holbrook and Albury. Ronnie Peel and their roadie John Brewster (not John Brewster of The Angels) were both hospitalised, although their injuries were not serious. The major casualty was the band's equipment, most of which was destroyed in the crash. Three weeks later the Sunrise agency organised a benefit gig in Sydney at the Green Elephant (the Doncaster Theatre) in Kensington, including the La De Da's, Sherbet, Buffalo, Pirana, Lotus, Home, Country Radio, I'Tambu, Original Battersea Heroes and Hush, which raised almost $2000 for the group.

By mid-year, the band were being hailed as Australia's leading live act and Borich was widely regarded as Australia's pre-eminent guitar hero. With Chugg back on board as manager, Kevin was impatient to record a new album. EMI agreed to a new record in September. But the first sessions at EMI's studios were deemed unsatisfactory by the band and all but two tracks were scrapped. (The two tracks, "She Tell Me What To Do" and "No Law Against Having Fun" later surfaced on the LP Rock'n'Roll Sandwich.)

Later sessions were recorded with different equipment at the Green Elephant Hotel and were more successful. The resulting LP, Rock'n'Roll Sandwich, was lauded by Glenn A. Baker as "one of Australia's finest rock albums, a fiery, cohesive work dominated by the superbly talented Kevin Borich and carried off by the reliable gutsiness of Peel and Barber." Touring behind the new LP, released in November 1973, the La De Da's enjoyed their most successful period to date, including supports for Elton John and Suzi Quatro on their Australian tours.

The solid gigging continued through 1974 and into 1975, including a well-received appearance at the final Sunbury Festival in January 1975.

During 1975 problems for the band increased—Australian commercial radio was ignoring their records, and internal tensions were building. The situation was described by Glenn A. Baker in 1981:

The disintegration that took hold ... was an easily diagnosed malady which has afflicted every Australian rock and roll band that has ever achieved a degree of popular success. Essentially it comes down to: the bigger you become, the more meaningless your future. Overseas bands can make an album, do a tour and then hide away for a year or two to prepare the next LP with no concern for loss of position. In Australia, just three months off the road to prepare new material and a band's gig price drops to half, the media erects new superstars in their place, and the public acts as if they never were ... That is what killed the La De Da's: the bludgeoning effect of realising that, after 10 hard years, nothing tangible had really been achieved and the only thing that lay ahead was more of the same.

By early 1975, the band's spirits were flagging. In March EMI issued Legend, a valedictory sampler of single A-sides, recent recordings and leftovers put together by Michael Chugg, which also included a much-requested studio rendition of "All Along The Watchtower", Kevin's Hendrix-inspired live showpiece.

In May 1975, Borich officially announced that the La De Da's would disband.

After The La De Da's
Kevin Borich put together a short-lived touring band under the La De Da's name, with Harry Brus and Barry Harvey, after which he formed the Kevin Borich Express.

After the split of Band of Light in 1975, Phil Key left the music business and, in 1984, he died.
Ronnie Peel went on to have a solo career in the late 1970s performing as Rockwell T James. In later years he was part of John Paul Young's backing band.

The remaining original La De Da's' members reunited in New Zealand in 1992 for a Galaxie Club reunion show and played a set dedicated to the memory of Phil Key.

Personnel
Kevin Borich (guitar, vocals) 1964–1975
Phil Key (guitar, vocals) 1964–1972 (died 1984)
Trevor Wilson (bass) 1964–1970
Brett Neilsen (drums, vocals) 1964–1968 
Bruce Howard (keyboards) 1965–1972 (died 28th July 2021) 
Keith Barber (drums) 1968–1975
Bryan Harris (drums) 1968
Reno Tehei (bass) 1970
Peter Roberts (bass) 1971–1973
Ronnie Peel (bass, vocals) 1973–1975 (died 2020)

Discography

Studio albums
The La De Da's (1966, Zodiac Records / Philips)
Find Us a Way (1967, Zodiac Records)
The Happy Prince (1969, EMI)
Rock and Roll Sandwich (1973, EMI)

Live albums
Sunbury 1972 (1972, His Master's Voice)

Compilations
Legends (1975, EMI) (rereleased on CD as The Best of the La De Das Legend)
Rock 'n' Roll Decade 1964-74 (1981, EMI)
La De Da's (1995, Zero Records (rereleased in 2003 on EMI)
How Is the Air Up There?: 1966-1967 (2000, Ascension Records)
La De Da's (2014, Real Groovy Records)

EP
Stupidity (1967, Philips)

Singles

Compilation appearances
 Nuggets II: Original Artyfacts from the British Empire and Beyond, 1964–1969 ("How Is the Air Up There?")
 Wild Things: Wyld Kiwi Garage 1966-1969 ("How Is the Air Up There?", "Don't You Stand in My Way")

Awards
 1977 - Australian Rock Music Awards - Best Guitarist
 1978 - Australian Rock Music Awards - Best Guitarist
 1978 - Concert of The Year Award (Marconi Club)
 1983 - Ampex Golden Reel Award
 1983 - The Party Boys - LP EMI Gold Record
 1983 - Live at Several 21st (Party Boys) EMI Gold Record
 1987 - He's Gonna Step on You (Party Boys) EMI Gold Record
 1999 - Australian Blues Music Festival - Heritage Award
 2003 – Australian Blues Foundation – Hall of Fame

References

Glenn A. Baker
liner notes to Rock'n'Roll Decade 1964-74
(EMI EMY 508/9, 2LP set, 1981)

John Dix
Stranded in Paradise: New Zealand Rock and Roll 1955 to the Modern Era 
(Penguin, NZ, 2005, first published 1988)

Ian McFarlane
Australian Encyclopedia of Rock & Pop
(Allen & Unwin, 1999)

Noel McGrath
Encyclopedia of Australian Rock
(Outback Press, 1978)

Chris Spencer/Zbig Nowara
Who's Who of Australian Rock
(Five Mile Press, 1994)

External links
 AudioCulture profile
 La De Das
 Kevin Borich official website
 

1963 establishments in New Zealand
1975 disestablishments in New Zealand
New Zealand garage rock groups
Australian rock music groups
New Zealand blues rock musical groups
Musical groups established in 1963
Musical groups disestablished in 1975